Steven Edward Carlson (born August 26, 1955) is an American former professional ice hockey forward and a former minor league hockey coach. He played in the World Hockey Association from 1975 to 1979 and the National Hockey League during the 1979–80 season. He also appeared in the movie Slap Shot as one of the three Hanson Brothers.

Biography

Carlson was born in Virginia, Minnesota. He appeared in the movie Slap Shot as one of the three Hanson Brothers, who were based on Carlson and his brothers and teammates. Carlson played in the World Hockey Association with the New England Whalers, Edmonton Oilers and Minnesota Fighting Saints and in the National Hockey League for the Los Angeles Kings, scoring nine goals for the Kings. While playing for the Edmonton Oilers in the WHA, he was the roommate of Wayne Gretzky during his rookie season. Carlson is one of six players to ever be on a team with Gordie Howe and on a team with Wayne Gretzky.

Since retiring from hockey, Carlson runs a power skating school in Johnstown, PA. He and his brothers also make numerous public appearances, primarily at hockey-related events and charities, as their Hanson Brothers characters. The trio also appeared in two sequels to Slap Shot, Slap Shot 2: Breaking the Ice, 2002 and Slap Shot 3: The Junior League, 2008.

On October 4, 2021, Carlson was diagnosed with Stage IV metastatic Squamous Cell Carcinoma.

Career statistics

Regular season and playoffs

Source

Coaching career

Transactions

Selected by Minnesota Fighting Saints, 7th round, #102 overall 1974 WHA Amateur Draft.
Selected by Detroit Red Wings, 8th round, #131 overall 1975 NHL Amateur Draft.
Traded to Edmonton (WHA) by Minnesota (WHA) with Mike Antonovich, Bill Butters, Jack Carlson, Dave Keon, Jean-Louis Levasseur and John McKenzie, January, 1977.
 Traded to New England (WHA) by Edmonton (WHA) with Jack Carlson, Dave Dryden, Dave Keon and John McKenzie for future considerations (Dave Debol, June, 1977), Dan Arndt and cash, January, 1977.

Hockey Cards

See also
List of NHL players

References

External links
 
 http://www.hansonbrothers.net/ - Official site for the Hanson Brothers

1955 births
Living people
American men's ice hockey centers
Baltimore Skipjacks coaches
Baltimore Skipjacks players
Detroit Red Wings draft picks
ECHL coaches
Edmonton Oilers (WHA) players
Ice hockey coaches from Minnesota
Ice hockey players from Minnesota
Johnstown Chiefs coaches
Johnstown Jets players
Los Angeles Kings players
Minnesota Fighting Saints draft picks
Minnesota Fighting Saints players
New England Whalers players
People from Virginia, Minnesota
Springfield Indians players